DYOK (720 AM) Aksyon Radyo is a radio station owned and operated by Manila Broadcasting Company. Its studio is located at the 3rd floor, Carlos Uy Building, Benigno Aquino Avenue corner Diversion Road, Barangay San Rafael, Mandurriao, Iloilo City, while its transmitter is located in Barangay Nabitasan, La Paz, Iloilo City, sharing tower site with sister station DYDH-AM. This station operates daily from 3:45 AM to 11:30 PM.

References

Radio stations in Iloilo City
News and talk radio stations in the Philippines
Radio stations established in 1991